Three regiments of the British Army have been numbered the 109th Regiment of Foot:

109th Regiment of Foot, raised in 1761
109th (Aberdeenshire) Regiment of Foot, raised in 1794
109th Regiment of Foot (Bombay Infantry), raised by the East India Company and placed on the British establishment as the 109th Foot in 1862